Pattonville R-III School District is a public school district in the suburbs of north St. Louis County, Missouri.

About
Other portions are in unincorporated St. Louis County (between Creve Coeur and Overland). The district is located near St. Louis Lambert International Airport. The district has won several awards related to the academic success of its students. 

The district contains five elementary schools, one K-8 school, two middle schools, and one high school. Current enrollment exceeds 5,000 students. Pattonville boasts a progressive program called Positive School, which is an alternative high school that is largely separated from the rest of the school.  Positive School's purpose is to ensure that students who would otherwise drop out finish their high school education. The high school was named to U.S. News & World Report's Best High Schools lists in 2013, 2015, 2019 and 2020. Pattonville spends over $14,000 per student and is ranked the most diverse school district in Missouri by Niche.

List of schools

Elementary
 Bridgeway, located in Bridgeton
 Drummond, located in St. Ann
 Parkwood, located in Maryland Heights
 Remington Traditional School (grades K-8), located in Maryland Heights
 Rose Acres, located in Maryland Heights
 Willow Brook, located in Creve Coeur

Middle schools
 Holman Middle School, located in St. Ann
 Pattonville Heights Middle School, located in Maryland Heights

High school
 Pattonville High School, located in Maryland Heights

Alternative
 Pattonville Positive School (located in Pattonville High School)

Former schools
 Carrollton Elementary School (shut down in 2002) was located in Bridgeton.
 Carrollton Oaks Elementary School (shut down in 2002) was also located in Bridgeton. Both schools were bought out by St. Louis Lambert International Airport and were replaced by Drummond Elementary School.
 Pattonville Elementary School was located on Fee Fee Road near the intersection of St. Charles Rock Road. It was replaced by Parkwood Elementary starting in the 1967 school year.
 St. Ann Elementary School was located on St. Bridget Lane in St. Ann next to the Airway Drive In.
 Penn Elementary School (a one-room school), located on Old St Charles Rock Rd was closed in the 1940s
 Junction Elementary School (a one-room school) on McKelvey Road (at Vigus Quarry) was closed in 1954.
 Penn Junction School opened in 1955 and was closed in the 1980s. It was named for the two schools that it replaced. The building is currently used as a Christian school and is located about a half mile east of the current high school. 
 Mt. Pleasant Elementary School was located on Warson Road at Kratky Lane near Lindbergh Boulevard. It closed in 1978, but the building remains standing and as of 2019, is owned by a nearby church.
 Bridgeton School was closed in the 1980s.
 Briar Crest located in Unincorporated St. Louis County

Surrounding Districts
Pattonville's neighboring districts include Hazelwood, Parkway, Ladue and Ritenour.

References

External links
 Pattonville School District
 Pattonville High School website
 Missouri Department of Elementary and Secondary Education: School Directory

School districts in Missouri
Education in St. Louis County, Missouri
1879 establishments in Missouri
School districts established in 1879